Eutrichopoda is a genus of parasitic flies in the family Tachinidae. There are about five described species in Eutrichopoda.

Species
These five species belong to the genus Eutrichopoda:
 Eutrichopoda abdominalis Townsend, 1929
 Eutrichopoda flavipenna
 Eutrichopoda nigra Townsend
 Eutrichopoda pyrrhogaster (Wiedemann, 1830)
 Eutrichopoda tegulata (Townsend, 1897)

References

Further reading

 
 
 
 

Tachinidae
Articles created by Qbugbot